Al-Jammasin al-Gharbi was a Palestinian Arab village in the Jaffa Subdistrict. It was depopulated during the 1947–48 Civil War in Mandatory Palestine on March 17, 1948. It was located 6.5 km northeast of Jaffa.

History
Al-Jammasin's inhabitants were known to be descendants of nomads from the Jordan Valley.  In 1596, a Jammasin tribe appear in the  Ottoman  census, located in the Nahiya of Bani Sa'b of the Liwa of Nablus, paying taxes on water buffalos.  Khalidi writes that it is not certain that this was the same tribe that settled  the two Jammasin villages.  The tribe was known to have settled in the area by the 18th century.

British Mandate era
In the 1922 census of Palestine conducted by the British Mandate authorities, the tribal area of Jammasin had a population of 200 Muslims, while in the  1931 census  Jammasin el-Gharbiya had 566  Muslim inhabitants.

In the 1945 statistics  the population of Al-Jammasin al-Gharbi consisted of 1,080 Muslims and the total land area was 1,365  dunams of land, according to an official land and population survey.  Of this land, Arabs used 202 dunams for citrus and bananas, 151 for plantations and irrigable land, 173 for cereals, while a total of 149 dunams were non-cultivable areas.

The children attended school on Al-Shaykh Muwannis.

1948, aftermath
In December, 1947,  Jewish agents reported that Arabs were leaving the Al-Jammasin villages. In  December 1947 and January 1948 the leaders of al-Shaykh Muwannis, Al-Mas'udiyya, Al-Jammasin al-Sharqi/Al-Jammasin al-Gharbi, and the mukhtars of Ijlil al-Qibliyya,  Ijlil al-Shamaliyya and  Abu Kishk  met with Haganah representatives  in Petah Tikva. These villages wanted peace, and promised not to harbor any Arab Liberation Armies or local Arab Militia. They further promised that, in the case they were not able to keep them out alone, they were to call on Haganah for help. The Jammasin villages, together with Abu Kishk, also jointly approached a Jewish police officer at  Ramat Gan.

References

Bibliography

External links
 Welcome To al-Jammasin al-Gharbi
al-Jammasin al-Gharbi,  Zochrot
Survey of Western Palestine, Map 13: IAA,  Wikimedia commons

Arab villages depopulated during the 1948 Arab–Israeli War
District of Jaffa